Andrew Clifford Winawer Brandler was the Chief Executive Officer of Hong Kong utility company CLP Group from 2000 to 2013, and Chairman of Hong Kong General Chamber of Commerce from 2008 to 2010.

Biography

Professional career
Brandler holds an MA degree from the University of Cambridge and an MBA degree from Harvard Business School. He is a qualified Chartered Accountant.

His background is in Investment banking, having served as Head of Asia-Pacific Corporate Finance of Schroders, in Hong Kong prior to his appointment as Chief Executive Officer of Hong Kong listed utility company CLP Group in 2000. He was CEO of CLP Group from 2000 to 2013.

In May 2008, following the fraud investigation into Lily Chiang, Brandler was elected to replace Chiang as Chairman of the Hong Kong General Chamber of Commerce. He was Chairman of the Chamber from 2008 to 2010.

Community positions
 Chairman of the Hong Kong General Chamber of Commerce (2008–2010)
 Council Member of the Hong Kong Trade Development Council 
 Council Member of the Hong Kong Management Association 
 Member of the Operations Review Committee of the Independent Commission Against Corruption

References

Hong Kong people
Living people
Hong Kong chief executives
Alumni of the University of Cambridge
Harvard Business School alumni
1956 births
Schroders people